Contrary Creek is a stream in Osage County in the U.S. state of Missouri. It is a tributary of Gasconade River.

The stream headwaters arise just east of Missouri Route 89 and west of the community of Welcome. The stream flows to the southeast past Welcome and under Missouri Route N between Freedom and Ryors. The strean then turns to the north adjacent to U. S. Route 50 and then northwest before entering the Gasconade below Mount Sterling in adjacent Gasconade County.

Contrary Creek was named for the fact the direction in which Contrary Creek flows is contrary relative to other nearby streams.

See also
List of rivers of Missouri

References

Rivers of Osage County, Missouri
Rivers of Missouri
Tributaries of the Gasconade River